Brian Williams (14 September 1936 – 19 January 2010) was  a former Australian rules footballer who played with Fitzroy in the Victorian Football League (VFL).

Notes

External links 
		

1936 births
2010 deaths
Australian rules footballers from Victoria (Australia)
Fitzroy Football Club players
Camperdown Football Club players